Porins B and C are cell wall channel-forming proteins  from Corynebacterium. Porin B from Corynebacterium glutamicum (Brevibacterium flavum) allows the exchange of material across the mycolic acid layer, which is the protective nonpolar barrier. Porin B has an alpha helical core structure consisting of four alpha-helices surrounding a nonpolar interior. There is a disulfide bridge between helices 1 and 4 to form a stable covalently bound ring. The channel of PorB is oligomeric.

References

Protein families